Edmund Roche was an Irish Sinn Féin politician. He was elected unopposed as a Sinn Féin Teachta Dála (TD) to the Second Dáil for the Kerry–Limerick West constituency at the 1921 elections. He opposed the Anglo-Irish Treaty and voted against it. He was re-elected unopposed at the 1922 general election to the Third Dáil as an anti-Treaty Sinn Féin TD but did not take his seat. He did not contest the 1923 general election.

References

Year of birth missing
Year of death missing
Early Sinn Féin TDs
Members of the 2nd Dáil
Members of the 3rd Dáil
People of the Irish Civil War (Anti-Treaty side)
Politicians from County Kerry